Else Ury's Nesthäkchen is a Berlin doctor's daughter, Anne Marie Braun, a slim, golden blond, quintessential German girl. The ten-book Nesthäkchen series follows Annemarie from infancy (Nesthäkchen and Her Dolls) to old age and grandchildren (Nesthäkchen with White Hair). Volume 4 describes Anne Marie's experiences in World War I from 1914 to 1916.

Plot summary

Anne Marie's father, Dr. Braun, is a soldier and medical officer in France. Her mother is absent. Mrs. Braun was in England at the outbreak of war, visiting with her cousin Annie, who is married to an Englishman. Mrs. Braun can not go back to Germany because she missed her last opportunity for departure. Of her letters, only some get to her family. During the absence of the parents, the grandmother, the nanny Lena, and the cook Hanne care for Annemarie and her brothers.
In England, Mrs. Braun is arrested as an alleged spy, after she has spoken, imprudently excited, about the success of German submarines. She is released soon afterwards.
Anne Marie's brother Hans brings a foundling home. The baby, an East Prussian refugee, would likely have perished. Annemarie takes the child into the house enthusiastically and gives him the name “Hindenburg” for Paul von Hindenburg. Finally, the noisy child is passed to the concierge couple and given the name Max. Annemarie’s patriotism goes so far that a "foreign concept checkout" is set up at home and in class. Anyone who uses a foreign word must pay five cents.
In Anne Marie's class a new girl, Vera Burkhard, arrives from Czernowitz in Bukovina. Vera hardly speaks German. Spurred on by two older girls, Anne Marie holds Vera for a Polish spy, therefore an enemy, and begins to bully the girl. Anne Marie’s girlfriends Margot, Ilse and Marlene have compassion for Vera, but dare not oppose the dominant Anne Marie. Occasionally Anne Marie has doubts about the correctness of her behavior, but she does not want to admit she is wrong. Finally, the class teacher announces that Vera's father has been killed in the Carpathian battle (Gorlice–Tarnów Offensive) on the German side and has therefore died a hero’s death. Although Vera is devastated and distraught, her reputation is restored and the shamed Anne Marie wants to make up for her bad behavior. Vera is now her best friend.
Other important episodes:
Anne Marie believes that a Thai man living in her building is a Japanese alien, an enemy, and henceforth no longer greets him. Lena, her nanny, tells her that rudeness is never patriotic.  Anne Marie fears her mother is being treated badly in England. She says this to her doctor, a colleague of her father, who laughs: "The English don’t treat ladies badly, even when they belong to an enemy nation." One evening Anne Marie prays to God, asking that he assist Germany; but she realizes that perhaps French and English children pray to the same God. She then asks God to be neutral, at least. When Annemarie does not want to learn French because it is the language of the enemy, her teacher gives her a lesson in thinking ahead: After the war, relations between peoples will need to be rebuilt, language skills are mandatory, and the Fatherland needs an educated youth.
Volume 4 ends with the surprising return of Mrs. Braun from England and the hope for a victorious peace. As at the end of all volumes in the series, Anne Marie’s maturation is suggested. But in the next volume, Annemarie is the same spirited, spoiled girl.
The message of the book is ambiguous. Despite her patriotic enthusiasm for Germany and occasional chauvinism ("You will feel the German fist" and similar sentiments), Ury preaches no hate. She considers war a sad event and peace a normal state. Her tone is always conciliatory. Ury strongly criticizes Anne Marie's relational aggression against Vera as unacceptable behavior and calls Anne Marie a "silly girl."

Postwar controversy

After 1945 the new publisher removed Nesthäkchen and the World War from the Nesthäkachen series, because it was on the censorship list of the allied control boards. Ury was, like the majority of German Jews, fiercely patriotic, and her descriptions of the events in and around the First World War were classified as glorifying war. Since 1945 the Nesthäkchen series has consisted of only 9 volumes. Steven Lehrer translated Nesthäkchen and the World War into English in 2006 and Nesthäkchen in the Children's Sanitorium in 2014. Ury also wrote other books and stories, primarily for girls and young women. German women still buy and read Ury's books, almost all of which are in print.

Critical reception
"A uniquely sentimental look at World War I through the eyes of a preteen German girl. Though still immensely popular in Germany, Ury's Nesthäkchen books are virtually unknown in the United States, an omission Lehrer looks to correct with this fine translation, complete with notes and a brief but highly informative introduction." Kirkus Reviews
"Ury's work has been long overlooked in German history, and Lehrer's annotated translation of this work has made an important contribution." H-Net Reviews

Genre
The Nesthäkchen books represent a German literary genre, the Backfischroman, a girls' novel that describes maturation and was intended for readers 12 – 16 years old. A Backfisch (“teenage girl”, literally “fish for frying”) is a young girl between fourteen and seventeen years of age. The Backfischroman was in fashion between 1850 and 1950. It dealt overwhelmingly with stereotypes, traditional social images of growing girls absorbing societal norms. The stories ended in marriage, with the heroine becoming a Hausfrau. Among the most successful Backfischroman authors, beside Else Ury, were Magda Trott, Emmy von Rhoden with her Der Trotzkopf and Henny Koch. Ury intended to end the Nesthäkchen series with volume 6, Nesthäkchen Flies From the Nest, describing Nesthäkchen's marriage. Meidingers Jugendschriften Verlag, her Berlin publisher, was inundated with a flood of letters from Ury's young fans, begging for more Nesthäkchen stories. After some hesitation, Ury wrote four more Nesthäkchen volumes, and included comments about her initial doubts in an epilogue to volume 7, Nesthäkchen and Her Chicks.

Author
Else Ury (November 1, 1877 in Berlin; January 13, 1943 in the Auschwitz concentration camp) was a German writer and children's book author. Her best-known character is the blonde doctor's daughter Annemarie Braun, whose life from childhood to old age is told in the ten volumes of the highly successful Nesthäkchen series. The books, the six-part TV series Nesthäkchen (1983), based on the first three volumes, as well as the new DVD edition (2005) caught the attention of millions of readers and viewers.

References

German children's literature
Fictional German people
German books
Child characters in literature
Children's fiction books
1917 children's books